The large-tailed nightjar (Caprimulgus macrurus) is a species of nightjar in the family Caprimulgidae. It is found along the southern Himalayan foothills, eastern South Asia, Southeast Asia and northern Australia. This species is a resident of the countries of Australia, Bangladesh, Bhutan, Brunei, Cambodia, China, India, Indonesia, Laos, Malaysia, Myanmar, Nepal, Pakistan, Papua New Guinea, Philippines, Singapore, Thailand, Timor-Leste and Vietnam. Its natural habitats are subtropical or tropical moist lowland forest, subtropical or tropical mangrove forest, and subtropical or tropical moist montane forest.

In Malaysia it is known to frequent cemeteries at night, hence its rather macabre common name burung tukang kubur ("graveyard nightjar").

References

Gallery

large-tailed nightjar
Birds of Southeast Asia
large-tailed nightjar
Taxonomy articles created by Polbot